The Oceania Footballer of the Year award is presented each year to the best football (soccer) player from the Oceania region, as chosen by a panel of football journalists.  The award was dominated by Australian players until that nation became part of the Asian Football Confederation, and is now similarly dominated by New Zealand players. New Zealand's Wynton Rufer is tied with Harry Kewell for the most titles with three awards each, whilst New Caledonia's Christian Karembeu, New Zealand's Shane Smeltz and Ryan Nelsen and Australia's Robbie Slater have each won the award twice.

Winners

Winners by country

Other Oceania Awards 
Wynton Rufer was voted as the Oceania Footballer of the Century.

Mark Bosnich was voted Oceania Goalkeeper of the Century.

References

Oceania Player of the Year

Footballer
Oceania
Awards established in 1988